Evgeniya Rodina was the defending champion, but lost in the first round to Denisa Allertová.

Magdaléna Rybáriková won the title, defeating Alison Van Uytvanck in the final, 7–5, 7–6(7–3).

Seeds

Draw

Finals

Top half

Bottom half

References
Main Draw

Aegon Ilkley Trophy - Women's Singles